György Mezey (born 7 September 1941) is a former Hungarian football (soccer) player and coach.

He was the coach of the Hungary national football team from 1983 to 1986, leading the team to the 1986 FIFA World Cup. During the 2006 FIFA World Cup he was part of FIFA's Technical Study Group.

Honours
Manager 

Budapest Honvéd FC
Nemzeti Bajnokság I: 1990–91

Budapesti VSC
Magyar Kupa runner-up: 1996–97

MOL Fehérvár FC
Nemzeti Bajnokság I: 2010–11
Magyar Kupa runner-up: 2010–11
Szuperkupa: 2011

Personal 

 Manager of the Year in Hungary: 2009–10

References

Sources
 Ki kicsoda a magyar sportéletben?, II. kötet (I–R). Szekszárd, Babits Kiadó, 1995, 306. o.,  
origo.hu: Mexikótól Matthäusig - Mezey György pályafutása 
origo.hu: Interview with Mezey
Profile on vidi.hu

External links
 

1941 births
Living people
People from Bačka Topola
Hungarians in Vojvodina
Hungarian footballers
Hungarian football managers
Hungarian expatriate football managers
Hungary national football team managers
Budapest Honvéd FC managers
Vasas SC managers
Újpest FC managers
Fehérvár FC managers
1986 FIFA World Cup managers
Expatriate football managers in Kuwait
Kuwait national football team managers
Association football midfielders
Hungarian expatriate sportspeople in Kuwait
Al Tadhamon SC managers
Expatriate football managers in Finland
Nemzeti Bajnokság I managers
Budafoki LC footballers
MTK Budapest FC players
Al-Yarmouk SC (Kuwait) managers